AJC may refer to:

 Agreement on Journey Continuation, an agreement between European rail operators to allow passengers in case of a missed connection
 Allen Jack+Cottier (AJ+C), an architectural practice
 American Jewish Committee, an advocacy group "widely regarded as the dean of American Jewish organizations"
 American Jewish Congress, an association of Americans organized around Jewish interests
 Anderson Junior College, a two-year school in Singapore
 Anti-jitter circuit, an electronic device designed to reduce jitter in a regular pulse signal
 The Atlanta Journal-Constitution, an American newspaper in Georgia
 Atlantic Jewish Council, a Canadian partner of the Centre for Israel and Jewish Affairs
 Auschwitz Jewish Center in Oświęcim, a museum and cultural center in Oświęcim, Poland 
 Australian Jockey Club, a predecessor racing organization to the Australian Turf Club
 Australia-Japan Cable, a submarine telecommunications cable system
 Academy of Journalism and Communication, a university in Vietnam